Mohamed Abdelmineim Ankaba is a Sudanese footballer who plays for the Sudanese national team and for Al-Merrikh SC in the Sudan Premier League. His position is a striker and also centre forward.

He played in a 2012 Summer Olympics qualifying match against Egypt on June 4, 2011 and for the Sudan B Team in the Football at the 2011 Pan Arab Games.

References

External links
"We have little choice but go for plenty of goals –Mohamed Ankba", 05-04-2011

Sudanese footballers
Living people
Association football forwards
1990 births
Sudan international footballers
Al Khartoum SC players
Al-Merrikh SC players
El Hilal SC El Obeid players
Al-Mourada SC players
Al Ahli SC (Khartoum) players